"Taking the Town" is a song by Australian rock band Icehouse, written by Iva Davies. It was released in April 1984 as the lead single from their third studio album Sidewalk. It peaked at No. 29 on the Australian chart.

Promotional music video
The music video for "Taking the Town" was filmed by Russell Mulcahy in Sydney, and used similar effects to Elton John's "Sad Songs (Say So Much)", filmed in Rushcutters Bay also by Russell Mulcahy when John was in Sydney for his first marriage. It did not feature Icehouse's then-keyboardist Andy Qunta, instead it featured a look-alike with his back to the camera.

Track listing
 12" Single
"Taking the Town (Extended Dance Mix)" – 5:11
"Dance On" – 3:54
"Taking the Town" – 3:32

 7" Single
"Taking the Town" – 3:32
"Java" – 4:41

Charts

References

External links
 

1984 singles
1984 songs
Icehouse (band) songs
Songs written by Iva Davies
Chrysalis Records singles
Regular Records singles